The 1982 All-Ireland Senior Ladies' Football Championship Final was the ninth All-Ireland Final and the deciding match of the 1982 All-Ireland Senior Ladies' Football Championship, an inter-county ladies' Gaelic football tournament for the top teams in Ireland.

Kerry won by six points in terrible weather. This was the first title of their nine-in-a-row.

References

All-Ireland Senior Ladies' Football Championship Final
All-Ireland Senior Ladies' Football Championship Finals
Kerry county ladies' football team matches
Offaly county ladies' football team matches
All-Ireland